Ryan "The Man" Hurley (born 13 September 1975 in Springhead, Barbados) is a former West Indian cricketer who played nine ODIs in 2003–04. He made his ODI debut in May 2003 against Australia where he took 1 for 57 and was run out without facing a ball.

References

External links

1975 births
Living people
West Indies One Day International cricketers
Barbadian cricketers
Barbados cricketers